John McKenna (born 1882) was an English footballer who played as a defender.

External links
 LFC History profile

1882 births
English footballers
Liverpool F.C. players
English Football League players
Year of death missing
Association football defenders